Morgade is a surname. Notable people with the surname include:

Ana Morgade (born 1979), Spanish presenter, comedian and actress
José Manuel Rodríguez Morgade (born 1984), Spanish footballer